Gábor Kukovecz (born May 2, 1959) is the lead guitarist and forming member of the Hungarian heavy metal band Pokolgép. He appears on each and every Pokolgép release, having been in the band since its formation in 1982. He is the band's main songwriter and lyricist, and sometimes appears as a keyboardist on the albums.

External links
Pokolgép
Kukovecz data page

1959 births
Heavy metal guitarists
Heavy metal keyboardists
Hungarian guitarists
Male guitarists
Hungarian songwriters
Living people
Musicians from Budapest
Hungarian male musicians